Maharashtra State Highway 247 is a State highway in Nagpur, in the state of Maharashtra.  This state highway touches Kondhali, Katol, Sawargoan, up to Madhya Pradesh border connecting  with NH 69 at Badchicholi.

Summary 

This road is  one of the important road in Nagpur District providing connectivity with  two National Highway National Highway 6 (India)(old numbering) and NH 69

Major junctions 

 This highway started from the intersection at Kondhali village with National Highway 6 (India)(old numbering) and end at Badchicholi town connecting with NH 69 near Maharashtra border, in Nagpur District.

Connections 
Many villages, cities and towns in Nagpur districts are connecting by this state highway.
Kondhali
Katol
Sawargoan, Maharashtra
Badchicholi

See also 
 List of State Highways in Maharashtra

References 

State Highways in Maharashtra
State Highways in Nagpur District